The 2018 Big 12 Conference football season represents the 23rd season of Big 12 Conference football, talking place during the 2018 NCAA Division I FBS football season. The season began with non-conference play on Thursday, August 30, 2018. Big 12 Conference play began on Saturday, September 22, 2018.

The 2018 season will be the seventh for the Big 12 since the 2010–13 Big 12 Conference realignment brought the Big 12 membership to its current form.

As a ten-team league, the Big 12 will play a nine-game round-robin conference schedule and each member will play three non-conference games-one of which must be against another Power Five conference foe. The regular season will be followed by a conference championship game played between the regular-season champion and regular-season runner-up. The 2018 Big 12 Championship Game was held on Saturday, December 1, 2018. Oklahoma defeated Texas 39–27 to win their 12th Big 12 Championship.

Background

Previous season

Preseason

Recruiting

Preseason poll
The 2018 Big12 Preseason media poll was announced on July 12, 2018, prior to the Big12 media days.  The Big12 media days were held from July 16–17 in Frisco, Texas. Oklahoma was chosen to finish at the top of the standings for the third consecutive year in the 2018 Big 12 football preseason poll, voted on by media representatives.

 Oklahoma (46) – 509
 West Virginia (2) – 432
 TCU (1) – 390
 Texas (1) – 370
 Oklahoma State – 300
 Kansas State (2) – 283
 Iowa State – 250
 Texas Tech – 149
 Baylor – 125
 Kansas – 52

First place votes in 

Preseason awards
2018 Preseason All-Big 12

Offensive Player of the Year: Will Grier, West Virginia
Defensive Player of the Year: Ben Banogu, TCU
Newcomer of the Year: Brendan Radley-Hiles, Oklahoma

Head coaches

Coaches

Schedule

Regular season

Week one
Schedule and results:

Week two
Schedule and results:

Week three
Schedule and results:

Week four
Schedule and results:

Week five
Schedule and results:

Week six
Schedule and results:

Week seven
Schedule and results:

Week eight
Schedule and results:

Week nine
Schedule and results:

Week ten
Schedule and results:

Week eleven 
Schedule and results:

Week twelve
Schedule and results:

Week thirteen
Schedule and results:

Week Fourteen
Schedule and results:

Championship game 

Schedule and results:

Big 12 vs other conferences

Big 12 vs Power 5 matchups
This is a list of the non-conference games that Big-12 teams will play versus the power conference teams. They comprise teams from the ACC, Big 10, Pac-12 and SEC. In addition, although the NCAA does not consider BYU a "Power Five" school, the Big-12 does consider games against BYU as satisfying its "Power Five" scheduling requirement. All rankings are from the current AP Poll at the time of the game. (Rankings from the AP Poll):

Records against other conferences
2018 records against non-conference foes as of: 9/2/2018

Regular Season

Post Season

Rankings

Postseason

Bowl games

Rankings are from AP Poll.  All times Central Time Zone.

* Rankings based on CFP rankings

Selection of teams (7): Baylor, Iowa State, Oklahoma, Oklahoma State, TCU, Texas, West Virginia

Awards and honors

Player of the week honors

Postseason awards
2018 Consensus All-Americans

The following Big 12 players were named to the 2017 College Football All-America Team by the Walter Camp Football Foundation (WCFF), Associated Press (AP), Football Writers Association of America (FWAA), Sporting News (SN), and American Football Coaches Association (AFCA): Ben Powers, OL, Oklahoma.

Academic All-America Team Member of the Year (CoSIDA)

2018 All-Big 12

Offensive Player of the Year: Kyler Murray, QB, Oklahoma 
Defensive Player of the Year: David Long Jr., LB, West Virginia 
Offensive Freshman of the Year: Pooka Williams Jr., RB, Kansas
Defensive Freshman of the Year: Caden Sterns, DB, Texas
Offensive Lineman of the Year: Dalton Risner, Kansas State, Dru Samia, Oklahoma & Yodny Cajuste, West Virginia
Defensive Lineman of the Year: Charles Omenihu, Texas
Offensive Newcomer of the Year: Jalen Hurd, WR, Baylor
Defensive Newcomer of the Year: Greg Eisworth, DB, Iowa State
Special Teams Player of the Year: Austin Seibert, P/K, Oklahoma
Coach of the Year: Matt Campbell, Iowa State & Lincoln Riley, Oklahoma

All-Academic
First team

Second team

National award winners

 Kyler Murray, QB, Oklahoma: Heisman Trophy, Davey O'Brien Award, Manning Award, AP Player of the Year

Home game attendance

Bold – Exceed capacity
†Season High
‡ Record Stadium Attendance

References